Madhukar Sathe (born 30 August 1934) is an Indian former cricketer. He played first-class cricket for Bengal, Madhya Pradesh and Vidarbha.

See also
 List of Bengal cricketers

References

External links
 

1934 births
Living people
Indian cricketers
Bengal cricketers
Madhya Pradesh cricketers
Vidarbha cricketers
People from Wardha